The USSR Fencing Federation was the national organisation for fencing in the USSR. It was affiliated with the International Fencing Federation (FIE) since 1952. The headquarters of the USSR Fencing Federation were in Moscow. 
The USSR Fencing Federation hosted the 1966 World Fencing Championships.

Administration

Board  
The board consisted of a chairman, a deputy chairman, a secretary, and a treasurer.

Soviet fencers  

Vadim Gutzeit, Ukraine (saber), Olympic champion
 Grigory Kriss, Soviet (épée), Olympic champion, 2x silver
 Maria Mazina, Russia (épée), Olympic champion, bronze
 Mark Midler, Soviet (foil), 2x Olympic champion
 Mark Rakita, Soviet (saber), 2x Olympic champion, 2x silver
 Yakov Rylsky, Soviet (saber), Olympic champion
 Sergey Sharikov, Russia (saber), 2x Olympic champion, silver, bronze
 Viktor Sidyak 
 Vladimir Smirnov (1954–1982), Olympic and world champion 
 David Tyshler, Soviet (saber), Olympic bronze
 Eduard Vinokurov, Russia (saber), 2x Olympic champion, silver
 Iosif Vitebskiy, Soviet (épée), Olympic silver, 10x national champion

Fencing
Fencing organizations
Fencing in the Soviet Union